Tony Hale, Space Detective is a juvenile science fiction novel, the fifteenth in Hugh Walters' Chris Godfrey of U.N.E.X.A. series. It was published in the UK by Faber in 1973.

This and all subsequent books in the series focused on either Earth or local planetary adventures, as technology to explore further afield could not be justified by Walters.

Tony Hale was first introduced as a character in Moon Base One, and this is the only book to bear one of the main characters in the title. Copies are rare and fetch high prices.

Plot summary
A series of unexplained disappearances from Lunar City leads to the assignment of Morrey Kant, Serge Smyslov and Tony Hale to investigate.  Without any leads, Tony Hale devises a bold solo plan and is himself kidnapped.

External links
Tony Hale, Space Detective page

1973 British novels
1973 science fiction novels
Children's mystery novels
Chris Godfrey of U.N.E.X.A. series
Faber and Faber books
1973 children's books